José Guedes de Carvalho e Meneses (19 May 1814 – 10 December 1879) was a Portuguese colonial administrator. He was born on 19 May 1814 in Mancelos in northern Portugal. He was created Count of Costa by King Luís I in 1875. He was an older brother of Vasco Guedes de Carvalho e Meneses who was governor of Angola, Mozambique and Cape Verde. 

He was governor general of Cape Verde from 25 April 1864 until 11 February 1869, succeeding Carlos Joaquim Franco. He was succeeded by Caetano Alexandre de Almeida e Albuquerque. On 10 August 1874, he was appointed governor general of Mozambique, succeeding José Manuel Crispiniano da Fonseca. He was succeeded by Francisco Maria da Cunha on 1 December 1877.

See also
List of colonial governors of Cape Verde
List of colonial governors of Mozambique

Notes

1814 births
1879 deaths
People from Amarante, Portugal
Colonial heads of Cape Verde
Heads of state of Mozambique
Portuguese colonial governors and administrators
Portuguese generals